The San Diego State Aztecs women's track & field program represents San Diego State University in collegiate track and field (both indoor and outdoor competition). The Aztecs compete in the Mountain West Conference (MW) in Division I of the National Collegiate Athletic Association (NCAA). The women's track & field program officially encompasses two teams, as the NCAA regards indoor track & field and outdoor track & field as separate sports. Aztec women's track & field is based at the on-campus Aztrack, part of the SDSU Sports Deck complex.

Postseason

Indoor

Outdoor

NCAA individual event champions 
Aztec women's track & field has had athletes win 7 NCAA individual national championships at the Division I level.

See also 

 Aztec Hall of Fame

References

External links 

 

women's
Mountain West Conference track and field
College track and field teams in the United States
Women's sports in California